The Sixth constituency for French residents overseas (sixième circonscription des Français établis hors de France) is one of eleven constituencies each electing one representative of French citizens overseas to the National Assembly.

Area
This constituency is the smallest of the eleven by area. It covers two countries: Switzerland and Liechtenstein. As of New Year's Day 2011, it contained 145,108 registered French voters. Virtually all of these live in Switzerland, which has a greater number of registered French residents than any other country in the world.

This constituency elected its first ever representative at the 2012 French legislative election.

Deputies

Election results

2022

 
 
 
 
|-
| colspan="8" bgcolor="#E9E9E9"|
|-

2017

2012

Candidates
The list of candidates was officially finalised on 14 May. There were twenty-one candidates:

The Socialist Party chose Nicole Castioni, a resident of Geneva, as its candidate. She was a magistrate in the Criminal Court of Geneva, and, having dual French and Swiss citizenship, was an elected representative in the Parliament of Geneva from 1993 to 2001. Her deputy (suppléant) was Louis Lepioufle, also a resident of Geneva.

The Union for a Popular Movement chose Claudine Schmid. Sébastien Brack was her deputy (suppléant).

Europe Écologie–The Greens chose Ximena Kaiser Morris, with Jean Rossiaud as her deputy (suppléant). A resident of Lausanne, Kaiser Morris was also a member of the Green Party of Switzerland.

The Left Front (which unites several parties, most notably the French Communist Party and the Left Party) chose Magali Orsini, a long-term resident of Geneva and active participant in that city's left-wing politics. She was a Chartered Accountant, former lecturer in tax law and former assessor. Pierre Gauthier was her deputy (suppléant).

The National Front chose Christiane Floquet. Serge Mohler was her deputy (suppléant).

The centre-right Radical Party and the centrist Republican, Ecologist and Social Alliance jointly chose Marie-Françoise d'Anglemont as their candidate, with Marcel Paquier as her deputy (suppléant). She had dual French and Swiss citizenship, and had a political career in the Swiss Canton of Geneva.

The Radical Party of the Left chose Laila Barki, who worked in pharmaceuticals in Geneva. Philippe Berger was her deputy (suppléant).

The Pirate Party chose Romain Devouassoux, with Xavier Gillard as his deputy.

Solidarity and Progress, the French branch of the LaRouche movement, was represented by Odile Mojon, with Christophe Laverne as her deputy. Mojon, who worked as a documentarist translator, had dual French and Swiss citizenship.

Joseph Kuzsli was the candidate of the European Social-Democratic Party, with Pierre Baccale-Ramonatxco as his deputy.

Micheline Spoerri, former Minister for Police and Security in the government of the canton of Geneva, stood as the candidate of the "Independent Right". Jean-Patrick Bourcart is her deputy.

Pierre-Jean Duvivier, a resident of Switzerland, was an independent candidate, wishing to "strictly defend the private sector against the multiple attempts to constrain it". Tatiana Zhyvylo was his deputy.

Didier Salavert described himself as an "independent liberal" candidate, in the French meaning of the word (i.e. classical liberalism). Pierre Chappaz was his deputy.  He was endorsed by the Liberal Democratic Party.

The other independent candidates were: Bernard Garcia (with Gloria Giol as deputy); Guy Broustine (with Isabelle Lovera as deputy); Sébastien Jacques (with Annat Jacques as deputy); Nicolas Miguet (with Guillaume Barthelemey as deputy); Serge Cyril Vinet (with Sylvie Boutard as deputy); Christian Robert (with Tatiana Robert as deputy); Didier Tailliez (with Jean-Michel Barreyre as deputy); and Gérard Andrieux (with Geneviève Berthin-Hugault as deputy).

Results
As in the other expatriate constituencies, turnout in the first round was low. It was one of only three expatriate constituencies in which the main candidate of the right finished first.

Independent candidate Sébastien Jacques received a single vote (out of 23,390 votes cast). He had stood as representative of the International Capitalist Party, his main platform being the adoption by France of the Swiss fiscal model, and a rejection of the French government's "nauseating and unhealthy" efforts against tax evasion by expatriates.

References

6